Rødkærsbro station is a railway station serving the railway town of Rødkærsbro in Jutland, Denmark.

Rødkærsbro station is located on the Langå-Struer Line from Langå to Struer. The station was opened in 1863 with the opening of the Langå-Viborg section of the Langå-Struer Line. It offers direct InterCity services to Copenhagen and Struer as well as regional train services to Aarhus and Struer. The train services are operated by Arriva and DSB.

History 
Rødkærsbro station opened on 20 July 1863 with the opening of the Langå-Viborg section of the Langå-Struer railway line. In 1864, the railway line was continued from Viborg to Skive and in 1865 to Struer. In 1912, Rødkærsbro station also became the northern terminus of the new Kjellerup railway line from Rødkærsbro to Kjellerup, which was prolonged to Silkeborg in 1924.

The Kjellerup Line was closed in 1968. And in 1974, Rødkærsbro station was closed but continues as a railway halt.

Architecture 
The current station building was built in 1911 before the opening of the Kjellerup Line in 1912.

References

Citations

Bibliography

External links

 Banedanmark – government agency responsible for maintenance and traffic control of most of the Danish railway network
 DSB – largest Danish train operating company
 Arriva – British multinational public transport company operating bus and train services in Denmark
 Danske Jernbaner – website with information on railway history in Denmark

Railway stations opened in 1863
Railway stations in the Central Denmark Region
Railway stations in Denmark opened in the 19th century